Shavarsh Kocharyan (born 3 April 1948, Yerevan, Armenia) is an Armenian diplomat, former Deputy Minister of Foreign Affairs.

On November 10, 2020, during the political crisis caused by the 2020 Nagorno-Karabakh ceasefire agreement he submitted his resignation, being accepted on November 17.

In the early hours of April 13, 2004, Shavarsh Kocharyan as an opposition MP was taken into police custody during a violent crackdown on opposition protests.

References 

 Official website of MFA RA

Diplomats from Yerevan
Living people
1948 births
Politicians from Yerevan